The Oklahoma Health Center is a 325-acre medical district in Oklahoma City, Oklahoma, located one mile northeast of downtown Oklahoma City and just south of the Oklahoma State Capitol, near the confluence of Interstates 35, 40, and 235. Over 30 organizations are members of the Oklahoma Health Center Foundation.

The health center has multiple medical, research, and educational institutions, with around 8 million square feet of floor space, over 12,000 employees and 4,000 students, and an economic impact of over $3 billion. OU Health forms a large part of the health center's many clinics and services. The Oklahoma Health Center is part of the larger and newly formed Innovation District.

Healthcare Institutions
 Dean McGee Eye Institute
 Oklahoma Allergy & Asthma Clinic
 Oklahoma City VA Hospital
 Oklahoma Blood Institute
 OU Health
 Harold Hamm Diabetes Center
 Oklahoma Children's Hospital
 OU Medical Center
 OU Health Physicians
 Stephenson Cancer Center

Research & Educational Institutions
 ARL Bio Pharma
 DNA Solutions
 University of Oklahoma Health Sciences Center
 College of Allied Health
 College of Dentistry
 College of Medicine
 College of Nursing
 College of Pharmacy
 College of Public Health
 Graduate College
 Oklahoma Medical Research Foundation

History
Today's Oklahoma Health Center was founded in 1917 when the Oklahoma Legislature set aside 16.6 acres of land for the University of Oklahoma School of Medicine. The first building to be built was the University Hospital in 1919, present-day location of the College of Public Health.

Establishment of the Oklahoma Health Center began in 1964 when the city of Oklahoma City created an urban renewal plan in response to the poor and overcrowded state of medical and educational facilities. A group of city leaders visited Texas Medical Center in Houston, Texas in 1965. Inspired by the MD Anderson Foundation, which established the development of Texas Medical Center, the Oklahoma Health Sciences Foundation was founded later in 1965 to guide development of the health center in Oklahoma City.

References

Healthcare in Oklahoma
Medical districts